The Euphrates is the longest and one of the most historically important rivers of Western Asia.

Euphrates may also refer to:
 Tigris–Euphrates river system
 Euphratensis, a Roman province in Greater Syria, part of the late Roman Diocese of the East
 Euphrates the Stoic (35–118), Stoic philosopher from Tyre, in the Roman province of Syria
 Euphrates jerboa (Allactaga euphratica), a rodent of the family Dipodidae and genus Allactaga
 Euphrates softshell turtle (Rafetus euphraticus), a species of softshell turtle in the family Trionychidae
 Euphrates-class troopship, a five-ship class of iron screw troopships built for the Royal Navy during the 1860s
 Euphrates College, a coeducational high school in Harput (today Elazığ), eastern Turkey
 Euphrates Volcano, a joint operations room established during the Syrian Civil War
 Euphrates River (album), a 1974 album by The Main Ingredient

See also
 Al-Furat (disambiguation)